Chaumont Football Club is a French association football club founded in 1957. The club is based in Chaumont, Haute-Marne and its home stadium is the Stade Georges Dodin in the town, which has a capacity of 5,000 spectators. It had professional status from 1966 to 1969 and from 1970 to 1991. As of the 2009–10 season, the club plays in the Championnat de France amateur 2 Group C, the fifth tier of French football. It is managed by former AJ Auxerre and Olympique de Marseille defender, Stéphane Mazzolini.

Honours

Domestic

Management

Managerial history

Notable players

External links
  
 old official website 
 Chaumont FC results 1962-2012 

 
Sport in Haute-Marne
1957 establishments in France
Association football clubs established in 1957
Football clubs in Grand Est